Udea tachdirtalis is a moth in the family Crambidae. It was described by Zerny in 1935. It is found in Morocco.

References

tachdirtalis
Moths described in 1935